Slovenia was represented at the 2007 World Championships in Athletics by 12 athletes.

Competitors

References 

Nations at the 2007 World Championships in Athletics
World Championships in Athletics
Slovenia at the World Championships in Athletics